Commander Panah Khan was one of the top commanders of Ahmed Shah Massoud's Jamiat-e Islami during the civil war in Afghanistan. He is reportedly deceased.

Soviet resistance
On 18 July 1986, a regime-staged court proceeding in Kabul sentenced Panah Khan to death in absentia, along with other resistance commanders Ahmad Shah Massoud, Ismail Khan, Alaudin Khan, Haqqani and Sayed Mansour Hussainyar.

References

Afghan military personnel